Tuukka Tiensuu is a Finnish TV-director, writer and producer. He is best known for the internationally successful Finnish TV-series The Dudesons, Kill Arman and The Dudesons in America.

Early career and MoonTV

Tiensuu started his directing career on MoonTV in 1999, and worked for the company until 2003. His directorial works for the channel include the fashion show Dresscode, the game shows Overdose and Play, the adult entertainment show Pornostara, and the literature show Kirjarovio.

Rabbit Films and The Dudesons

In 2003 joined Rabbit Films and started working on the English-language version of the Finnish hit series Extreme Duudsonit. The name was eventually changed to The Dudesons and Tiensuu was a co-creator, writer, segment-director and editor on the show. The series was launched in 2006 and it quickly became the most internationally successful Finnish TV-series of all time, airing in over 150 countries and spawning four seasons.

In 2006 Tiensuu also worked as a co-creator, writer and a director of cinematography and editing in The Dudesons Movie, which was released theatrically in Finland. The film won the "Audience's Favorite movie award" in the Jussi-gaala 2006 (The Finnish Oscars).

In 2010 Tiensuu worked as a co-creator, producer, writer and a segment director in The Dudesons in America, an MTV USA series which was budgeted at 6 million dollars.

Kill Arman 

In 2008 Tiensuu created Kill Arman together with Arman Alizad. This martial arts show spawned two seasons, written and directed by Tiensuu. It was distributed worldwide and it aired in over 100 countries. The series was nominated for the Best Finnish TV-show of the year in the 2010 Venla-gaala.

Other projects

Tiensuu has also worked as a TV-commercial director for different production companies, such as Verse Productions, Rabbit Films and MoonTV. He has also directed many music videos for popular Finnish artists such as Indica, Paleface and Petri Nygård.

External links
 
 Rabbit Films homesite. 
 An article on a Finnish newspaper about Kill Arman's distribution deal to 104 countries.
 Dudesons In America on MTV
 Kill Arman as one of the nonimees for the best Finnish TV-show award in 2010.

Living people
People from Rovaniemi
Finnish television directors
Year of birth missing (living people)